Hypostomus pusarum is a species of catfish in the family Loricariidae. It is native to South America, where it occurs in the coastal drainages of northern Brazil, including the state of Ceará. The species reaches 20.3 cm (8 inches) in total length and is believed to be a facultative air-breather.

References 

pusarum
Fish described in 1913